Atanas Pashkulev (born 10 July 1987) is a Bulgarian footballer.

Career
Born in Sofia, Pashkulev began playing football for Cherno More Varna. He would play in the A PFG with Vidima-Rakovski during the 2010–11 season. In 2011, Pashkulev joined Greek Football League side Ethnikos Asteras on a two-year contract.

References

External links
Profile at Guardian Football
Profile at Onsports.gr
 

1987 births
Living people
Bulgarian footballers
First Professional Football League (Bulgaria) players
PFC Cherno More Varna players
PFC Marek Dupnitsa players
PFC Vidima-Rakovski Sevlievo players
Ethnikos Asteras F.C. players
Association football defenders